U-134 may refer to one of the following German submarines:

 , a Type U 127 submarine laid down during the First World War but unfinished at the end of the war; broken up incomplete 1919–20
 During the First World War, Germany also had this submarine with a similar name:
 , a Type UB III submarine ordered in 1917 but not completed by the end of the war
  was a submarine built in 1941, for service in the Second World War, and sunk in 1943.

Submarines of Germany